Lower Breakish is a village on the Isle of Skye in Scotland.

Gallery

References

External links 

Populated places in the Isle of Skye